Lee Lynch (born 27 November 1991) is an Irish footballer who plays for NIFL Premiership side Coleraine.

Career

Early career
Lee Lynch began his playing career with former Limerick club Roxboro United, followed by Summerville and finally Regional United where he played until the age of 16. He won two All-Ireland senior soccer titles with Limerick CBS. From there he moved to England to sign for West Bromwich Albion. He played an important role with the youth team there and progressed to play for their reserves where he made 20 appearances. After two years he left in 2010. He then moved to Spain and signed with the Glenn Hoddle Academy playing with Jerez for the 2010-11 season.

Drogheda United
Lynch returned home to Ireland in July 2011 to sign for Drogheda United midway through the season. He played every game until the end of the season scoring four goals from 14 games. He was named Fans' Player of the Year as he helped them keep their Premier Division status that season.

Sligo Rovers
Lynch's performances in Drogheda didn't go unnoticed and he signed for top four team Sligo Rovers on 6 January 2012. Aged 19 he quickly established himself in the first-team scoring his first goal against Bohemians in the third game of the season to give his new club a 3-0 win. He helped the club to win the league that season missing only three games and contributing three goals. He made 36 appearances in all competitions scoring four goals. 
After missing the first game of the 2013 season against Derry he started every league game after that scoring against Cork City and Derry City. He also scored three goals over two legs to help Rovers into the Setanta Sports Cup semi-final.
Lynch had two successful seasons with Sligo Rovers winning the 2012 League of Ireland and the 2013 FAI Cup.
It was during his premier season with Sligo when Lynch made his debut in Europa Cup again Sparta Moskva, narrowly losing out over two legs home and away. In 2013 following their league winning season, Lynch featured again Europe, this time in the Champions League qualifier, where he featured against FC Molte from Norway

St Patrick's Athletic
It was announced by St Patrick's Athletic manager Liam Buckley at the Saint's Player of the Year Award Ceremony that Lee had signed with the 2013 League of Ireland Premier Division Champions for the upcoming 2014 season along with Ken Oman and Conor McCormack.

Limerick
Lynch moved to his hometown club Limerick, on the League of Ireland summer transfer deadline day, 31 July 2016.

Hamilton Academical
Lynch signed for Hamilton Academical on 3 January 2015 after the international transfer window opened. He was released by Hamilton in March 2015.

Limerick
On 3 July 2015, Lynch signed for Limerick for a third time. Lynch played a pivotal part in helping to return Limerick to the League of Ireland Premier Division, scoring 10 goals from midfield and picking up fans' player of the year. Lynch was central in helping Limerick make it to the final of the EA sports cup. Despite scoring in the final to give his side a one nil lead at half time before St Patrick's Athletic ran out winners.

FC Arizona
In March 2018, Lynch signed for FC Arizona of the National Premier Soccer League in America.

Return to Sligo Rovers
In July 2018, Lynch re-signed for Sligo Rovers.

Larne
Lynch joined Larne in January 2019 and helped the club to the 2018–19 NIFL Championship title.

Coleraine
Lynch joined Coleraine in June 2022 for an undisclosed sum.

International
Lynch has two underage caps for Ireland coming at under-17 level. He scored twice on his debut against Finland. He has also been called up to under-18 and under-19 squads.

Personal life
He is the cousin of Jack Lynch who is also a professional footballer, having played for League of Ireland clubs Waterford, Cobh Ramblers, Galway United & Treaty United, where he is currently playing and is also the club's first ever captain.

Honours
Sligo Rovers
League of Ireland Premier Division (1): 2012
FAI Cup (1): 2013

St Patrick's Athletic
FAI President's Cup (1): 2014

Limerick
League of Ireland First Division (1): 2016

Larne
NIFL Championship (1): 2018–19
County Antrim Shield (2): 2020-21, 2021-22

References

External links

1991 births
Living people
Sportspeople from Limerick (city)
Republic of Ireland association footballers
Hamilton Academical F.C. players
Limerick F.C. players
St Patrick's Athletic F.C. players
Sligo Rovers F.C. players
Drogheda United F.C. players
League of Ireland players
West Bromwich Albion F.C. players
Jerez Industrial CF players
Republic of Ireland youth international footballers
Association footballers from County Limerick
Association football midfielders
Larne F.C. players
FC Arizona players
Expatriate soccer players in the United States
Coleraine F.C. players